Unto Hautalahti (11 March 1936 – 22 December 2019) was a Finnish racing cyclist. He was born in Hakalahdenk, and his profession was a metalworker. He won the Finnish national road race title in 1960, 1961 and 1966. He also competed in the individual road race and team time trial events at the 1960 Summer Olympics.

References

External links
 

1936 births
2019 deaths
Finnish male cyclists
People from Nivala
Olympic cyclists of Finland
Cyclists at the 1960 Summer Olympics
Sportspeople from North Ostrobothnia